Discovery Centre is an interactive science museum in Halifax, Nova Scotia. It is a not-for-profit charitable organization whose mission is to stimulate interest, enjoyment and understanding of science and technology.

History 
In October 2010, the Discovery Centre announced that it would move from Barrington Street to the Halifax Seaport, adjacent to the new headquarters of Nova Scotia Power. The museum relocated there in 2017.

COVID-19 pandemic 
During the COVID-19 pandemic, the Discovery Centre engaged in several promotional campaigns to encourage guests to accept COVID-19 vaccines. 

The museum received a $50,000 grant in July 2021 from the Government of Canada for a project titled “Why Immunize: Encouraging Vaccine Confidence in Mi'kmaw Communities.” It was awarded through a grant program called “Encouraging Vaccine Confidence in Canada” jointly administered by the Canadian Institutes of Health Research (CIHR), Natural Sciences and Engineering Research Council (NSERC) and the Social Sciences and Humanities Research Council (SSHRC).

It received an additional $392,000 grant from the Public Health Agency of Canada's Immunization Partnership Fund to increase confidence in COVID-19 vaccines in black communities, Mi'kmaq peoples and 2S/LGBTQIA+ groups.

Affiliations
The museum is affiliated with the Canadian Museums Association, Canadian Association of Science Centres, Association of Science and Technology Centres, and the Virtual Museum of Canada.

References

External links
 

Science museums in Canada
Museums in Halifax, Nova Scotia